Roscoe "Piggy" Word (January 3, 1882 – May 27, 1942) was a college football player and coach and lawyer.

University of Tennessee
Word was a prominent guard for the Tennessee Volunteers of the University of Tennessee. He was its only three-time captain and was selected All-Southern in 1907.  In 1906 he was an assistant coach, the team's first.

Law
Word was a member of the Knoxville firm of Smith, Word, & Anderson.

See also
1907 College Football All-Southern Team

References

1882 births
1942 deaths
Players of American football from Arkansas
American football guards
Tennessee Volunteers football players
All-Southern college football players
People from Marianna, Arkansas